Hanumangarh Junction railway station is a main railway station in Hanumangarh district, Rajasthan. Its code is HMH. It serves Hanumangarh city.

Hanumangarh is a major railway station on Jodhpur–Bathinda line, Sadulpur, Rewari, Jaipur, Sriganganagar, Anupgarh.

Background

Both metre-gauge and broad-gauge lines earlier passed through this station. There is a diamond railway crossing. The broad gauge started in 1982 from Bhatinda to Suratgarh via Hanumangarh and first train was flagged by Milkha Singh.

Development
The metre-gauge train has become history for Hanumangarh because in October 2012 Hanumangarh–Sadulpur metre-gauge track closed and is being converted into broad gauge. Hanumangarh to Sri Ganganagar railway track has been converted into broad gauge and presently three trains are running on this track from Hanumangarh to Sri Ganganagar.

Services
A number of trains connect to this major railway junction.

References

External links
 
 Hanumangarh Junction station on OpenStreetMap
 Hanumangarh Junction in pictures - Official website of Indian Railways

Railway junction stations in Rajasthan
Railway stations in Hanumangarh district
Bikaner railway division